A Lady Literate in Arts (LLA) qualification was offered by the University of St Andrews in Scotland for more than a decade before women were allowed to graduate in the same way as men, and it became popular as a kind of external degree for women who had studied through correspondence, or by attendance at non-university classes. Although awarded as a diploma, in terms of academic standard, it was equivalent to the Master of Arts.

Until 1892 women were not admitted to Scottish universities, and the LLA was the nearest qualification to a degree which was open to women in the country, although the University of Edinburgh offered certificates recognising achievement in classes organised by the Edinburgh Association for the University Education of Women, and in Glasgow, Queen Margaret College was offering a university-equivalent education and awards. To obtain an LLA candidates had to pass examinations at a university-approved centre, which might be in Scotland or outwith the country.

Formally established as the Lady Literate in Arts - LLA -  by 1877, even after 1892, the course continued to be popular with women who wanted to study for an arts degree without needing to attend one particular institution for three or four years. Thousands of women received an LLA before it was discontinued in the 1930s.

William Angus Knight (1836–1916), Professor of Moral Philosophy at St Andrews between 1876 and 1903, was a supporter of female education and the main force behind the university's introduction of the LLA diploma.

Notable literate ladies
The educationalist and headteacher Isabel Cleghorn, Helen Bannerman, the children's writer, and suffragette Margaret Nevinson both had LLAs, as did the wartime nursing heroine Violetta Thurstan.

References

Susan Sellers, Mischievous to the Public Interest: The Lady Literate in Arts Diploma and the Admission of Women to the University of St Andrews in Launch-Site for English Studies (1997) ed. Robert Crawford
R.N. Smart, Literate Ladies: a Fifty-Year Experiment in St Andrews University Alumnus Chronicle (1967)

External links
Lady Literate in Arts
William Knight

Higher education in Scotland

University of St Andrews
Distance education institutions based in the United Kingdom
Women in Scotland
1930s disestablishments in Scotland
20th-century establishments in Scotland
Liberal arts education